Ozothamnus obcordatus, the grey everlasting, is a shrub in the family Asteraceae, native to the states of Queensland, New South Wales, Victoria and Tasmania in Australia.

It grows to 1.5 metres high and has obcordate, broad-elliptic obovate leaves which are 6 to 15 mm long and 3 to 6 mm wide. These have tips that bend backwards and are shiny and green on the top and covered with grey hairs underneath.

The species is regarded as having potential in commercial cut flower production.

References

obcordatus
Asterales of Australia
Flora of New South Wales
Flora of Queensland
Flora of Tasmania
Flora of Victoria (Australia)
Plants described in 1838